Lobophytum sarcophytoides is a soft coral  known for two new cembrane-type diterpenoids, lobophytins and four new prostaglandins from  a specimen.

Chemistry
SYSU-MS001, a specimen of L. sarcophytoides, was collected in the South China Sea, was extracted, and biologists discovered two new cembrane-type diterpenoids, lobophytins and four new prostaglandins from it. Also, the chemical Sarcophytolin D has also been taken from other specimens of the species.

References

Alcyoniidae
Animals described in 1919